A Hebrew Bible manuscript is a handwritten copy of a portion of the text of the Hebrew Bible (Tanakh) made on papyrus, parchment, or paper, and written in the Hebrew language. (Some of the Biblical text and notations may be in Aramaic.) The oldest manuscripts were written in a form of scroll, the medieval manuscripts usually were written in a form of codex. The late manuscripts written after the 9th century use the Masoretic Text. The important manuscripts are associated with Aaron ben Asher (especially Codex Leningradensis).

The earliest sources (whether oral or written) of the Hebrew Bible disappeared over time, because of the fragility of media, wars, (especially the destruction of the First and Second Temples), and other intentional destructions. As a result, the lapse of time between the original manuscripts and their surviving copies is much longer than in the case of the New Testament manuscripts.

The first list of the Old Testament manuscripts in Hebrew, made by Benjamin Kennicott (1718–1783) and published by Oxford in 2 volumes in 1776 and 1780, listed 615 manuscripts from libraries in England and on the Continent. Giovanni Battista de Rossi (1822–1894) published a list of 731 manuscripts. The main manuscript discoveries in modern times are those of the Cairo Geniza (c. 1890) and the Dead Sea Scrolls (1947). In the old synagogue in Cairo were discovered 260,000 Hebrew manuscripts, 10,000 of which are biblical manuscripts. There are more than 200 biblical manuscripts among the Dead Sea Scrolls, some of them were written in the Paleo-Hebrew alphabet. They were written before the year 70 CE. 14 scroll manuscripts were discovered in Masada in 1963–1965.

The largest organized collection of Hebrew Old Testament manuscripts in the world is housed in the Russian National Library ("Second Firkovitch Collection") in Saint Petersburg.

Codex Leningradensis is the oldest complete manuscript of the Hebrew Bible in Hebrew. Manuscripts earlier than the 13th century are very rare. The majority of the manuscripts have survived in a fragmentary condition.

The oldest complete Torah scroll still in use has been carbon-dated to around 1250 and is owned by the Jewish community of the northern Italian town of Biella.

Masorah manuscripts

Proto-Masoretic from Second Temple period (1st century)
 Severus Scroll (named for the Roman Emperor who restored this scroll, reportedly seized from the Temple in Jerusalem, to the Jewish community in 220), a lost manuscript of early 1st century CE, only a few sentences are preserved by Rabbinic literature
 Paleo-Hebrew Leviticus scroll

Proto-Masoretic from "Silent Period" (2nd-10th century)
 Codex Hilleli, a lost manuscript of circa 600 CE, destroyed in 1197 in Spain, only a few sentences are preserved by Rabbinic literature
 Codex Muggeh (or Muga; ="corrected"), lost, cited as a source in Masoretic notations.

Masoretic (7th–10th century)
 Ben Asher Manuscripts, including several of those listed here-below (see Kahle)
 The London Manuscript and the Ashkar-Gilson Manuscript, the latter also known as the "Ashkar-Gilson Hebrew Manuscript #2", both from the same scroll, dated to the 7th or 8th century. The extant fragments cover Exodus 9:18–13:2 and 13:19–16:1.
 Codex Orientales 4445, also known as "London Codex", containing Genesis-Deuteronomy 1:33 (less Numbers 7:47–73 and Numbers 9:12–10:18). and dated by colophon to 920-950 CE.
 Codex Cairensis (Prophets), pointed by Moses Ben Asher, dated by a colophon 895 CE, contradicted by radiocarbon dating, which indicated an 11th-century date. It is the oldest manuscript bearing the date of its writing; written in Tiberias, subsequently was in Cairo, now deposited at Hebrew University of Jerusalem.
 Codex Sassoon 1053, 9th or 10th century, from the collection of David Solomon Sassoon. (missing first 10 pages of Genesis)
 Codex Babylonicus Petropolitanus (Latter Prophets), dated 916 CE, Russian National Library
 Aleppo Codex, 930 CE, written in Tiberias, now deposited at Israel Museum in Jerusalem (was complete, supposedly pointed by Aaron ben Moses ben Asher, partially missing since 1958); this manuscript is the basis of the Jerusalem Crown bible.
 Codex Leningradensis (complete), copied from a Ben Asher manuscript, dated 1008 CE, written in Cairo, now deposited at Russian National Library in Saint Petersburg; this manuscript is the basis of the Biblia Hebraica Stuttgartensia and other editions and is the oldest complete manuscript of the Hebrew Bible in Hebrew.
 Michigan Codex (Torah), 10th century
 Damascus Pentateuch, 10th century
 First Gaster Bible in the British Library, 10th century
(missing first 10 pages of Genesis)

Later (11th-17th century)
 Codex Yerushalmi, lost, reportedly used in Spain (circa 1010) by Jonah ibn Janah.
 Codex Reuchlinanus (Prophets), dated 1105 CE.
 Bologna Torah Scroll/Scroll 2, dated CE 1155-1255, University of Bologna Library
 Ms. Eb. 448 of the Vatican Library, with Targum Onkelos, dated 11–12 century
 Second Gaster Bible in the British Library, 11th-12th centuries 
 Braginsky Collection Codex Hilleli copy, 1241 Toledo, Spain (housed at Jewish Theological Seminary, New York)
 Damascus Crown, written in Spain in 1260.
 Cloisters Hebrew Bible; 1300-1350 CE, before 1366; earliest owner named David ha-Kohen Coutinh[o] on Rosh Hashanah in 1366; owned by Zaradel Synagogue in Egypt. Acquired by the Metropolitan Museum of Art in 2018 under The Cloisters Collection.
 Farhi Bible, written by Elisha Crescas in Provence between 1366 and 1383. Purchased by David Solomon Sassoon in 1913 in Aleppo, Syria.
 Rashba Bible, completed in 1383
 Erfurt Codices (complete, Berlin), E1 circa 14th century, E2 possibly 13th century, E3 possibly 11th century
 Codex Jericho (Pentateuch), lost, cited in the notes to a Massoretic manuscript written circa 1310.
 Al-Ousta Codex, 14th-century. Now at the Bibliotheque Nationale in Paris.
 Merwas Bible (14th-century)
 Codex Ezra, lost, C.D. Ginsburg owned a manuscript written in 1474 which purported to have been copied from this.
 Lisbon Bible, created in 1483 in Lisbon, Portugal
 Codex Sinai, mentioned in Massoretic notes and reportedly used by Elia Levita (circa 1540).
 MS. de Rossi 782, copied in Toledo Spain in 1277.
 Codex Sanbuki (named for Zambuqi, on the Tigris River), lost, frequently quoted in Massoretic annotations and apparently seen (circa 1600) by Menahem Lonzano.
 Codex Great Mahzor, lost, mentioned in Massoretic notes (the title suggests that this codex contained only the Pentateuch and those selections from the Prophets that were read during the liturgical year)

Modern discoveries
 Ketef Hinnom scrolls, late 7th or early 6th century BCE, placing them in the First Temple period
 Nash Papyrus, dated to the 2nd BCE – 1st CE
 Cairo Geniza fragments contains portions of the Hebrew Bible in Hebrew and Aramaic, discovered in Cairo synagogue, which date from about 4th century CE

Dead Sea Scrolls

Dated Between 250 BCE and 70 CE.
 Isaiah scroll, 1Qlsa, contains almost the complete text of the Book of Isaiah 
 4QDeutn, contains the Decalogue.
 4Q106
 4Q107
 4Q108
 4Q240
 6Q6

Qumran Cave 1

Qumran Cave 2

Qumran Cave 3

Qumran Cave 4

Qumran Cave 5

Qumran Cave 6

Qumran Cave 7

Qumran Cave 8

Qumran Cave 11

See also 
 Ancient literature
 Biblical manuscripts
 List of the Dead Sea Scrolls
 Septuagint manuscripts

Notes

References

Bibliography

Further reading 
 Würthwein Ernst (1988). Der Text des Alten Testaments, Stuttgart: Deutsche Bibelgesellschaft 1988, p. 40–47; English translation The text of the Old Testament: an introduction to the Biblia Hebraica
 Malcolm C. Davis, Ben Outhwaite,  Hebrew Bible Manuscripts in the Cambridge Genizah Collections: Taylor-Schechter additional series 32–255, with addenda to previous volumes, Cambridge University Library 2003
 Bernhard Pick, Lost Hebrew Manuscripts, Journal of the Society of Biblical Literature,  vol. 2, pages 122-127 (1882).
 C. David Ginsburg, Introduction to the Massoretico-Critical Edition of the Hebrew Bible (1897, London: Trinitarian Bible Society),  especially chapt. XII, History and Description of the Manuscripts, pages 469-778, and elsewhere in the volume for information on lost mss.
 Paul Kahle, The Hebrew Ben Asher Manuscripts, Vetus Testamentum, vol. 1, pages 161-167 (July 1951); mentions the Leningrad Codex, the Aleppo Codex, the Cairo Prophets (Codex Cairensis), and British Museum Or. 4445.
 [Emil G. Hirsch],"Bible Manuscripts", Jewish  Encyclopedia (1902) volume 3, pages 178-181, includes information on lost mss.
 Adolph Neubauer, The Introduction of the Square Characters in Biblical Manuscripts and an Account of the Earliest Manuscripts of the Old Testament, Studia Biblica et Ecclesiastica (Oxford Univ.), vol. 3, pages 1–36 (1891).

External links 
 The London Codex (Or. 4445) and other MSS., from the British Library holdings
 Dea Sea Scrolls Digital Library: Biblical compositions (218)

 
Old Testament-related lists
Hebrew manuscripts
Textual scholarship